The Church of England commemorates many of the same saints as those in the General Roman Calendar, mostly on the same days, but also commemorates various notable (often post-Reformation) Christians who have not been canonised by Rome, with a particular though not exclusive emphasis on those of English origin. There are differences in the calendars of other churches of the Anglican Communion (see Saints in Anglicanism).

The only person canonised in a near-conventional sense by the Church of England since the English Reformation is King Charles the Martyr (King Charles I), although he is not widely recognised by Anglicans as a saint outside the Society of King Charles the Martyr. The Church of England has no mechanism for canonising saints, and unlike the Roman Catholic Church it makes no claims regarding the heavenly status of those whom it commemorates in its calendar. For this reason, the Church of England avoids the use of the prenominal title "Saint" with reference to uncanonised individuals and is restrained in what it says about them in its liturgical texts. In order not to seem to imply grades of sanctity, or to discriminate between holy persons of the pre- and post-Reformation periods, the title "Saint" is not used at all in the calendar, even with reference to those who have always been known by that title, for example the Apostles.

No Old Testament figures are commemorated in the Church of England calendar, but the litany "Thanksgiving for the Holy Ones of God" (included in Common Worship: Times and Seasons on pp. 558–560, immediately after "The Eucharist of All Saints") includes ten names from before Christ, so they are presumably not excluded on principle, and could be considered among the saints.

The ninth Lambeth Conference held in 1958 clarified the commemoration of Saints and Heroes of the Christian Church in the Anglican Communion. Resolution 79 stated:

There is no single calendar for the various churches making up the Anglican Communion; each makes its own calendar suitable for its local situation.  As a result, the calendar here contains a number of figures important in the history of the English church.  Calendars in different provinces will focus on figures more important to those different countries.  At the same time, different provinces often borrow important figures from each other's calendars as the international importance of different figures becomes clear.  In this way the calendar of the Church of England has importance beyond the immediate purpose of supporting the liturgy of the English Church. It is, for example, one of the key sources of the calendar for the international daily office Oremus.

Holy Days are variously categorised as Principal Feasts, Festivals, Lesser Festivals, or Commemorations. In order to minimise problems caused by the ambivalence regarding the manner of commemoration of uncanonised persons, all such days are Lesser Festivals or Commemorations only, whose observance is optional.

The following table lists the Holy Days in the calendar of Common Worship, the calendar most generally followed in the Church of England (though the calendar of the Book of Common Prayer is still authorised for use). This calendar was finalised in 2000, with some further names added in 2010. Individual dioceses and societies may suggest additional observances for local use, but these are not included here. The table includes the feast date, the name of the person or persons being commemorated, their title, the nature and location of their ministry or other relevant facts, and year of death, all in the form in which they are set out in the authorised Common Worship calendar. The typography shows the level of the observance: BOLD CAPITALS denote Principal Feasts and Principal Holy Days, bold denotes Festivals, roman denotes Lesser Festivals, and italics denote Commemorations. SMALL CAPITALS denote observances that are unclassified.

Moveable dates
The Baptism of Christ, the Sunday following the Epiphany (when the Epiphany is kept on 6 January)
ASH WEDNESDAY, the Wednesday 46 days before Easter Day
MAUNDY THURSDAY, the Thursday in the week before Easter Day
GOOD FRIDAY, the Friday in the week before Easter Day
EASTER DAY, the first Sunday after the Paschal full moon
ASCENSION DAY, the Thursday forty days after Easter Day
DAY OF PENTECOST, the Sunday fifty days after Easter Day
TRINITY SUNDAY, the Sunday after Pentecost
The Day of Thanksgiving for the Institution of Holy Communion (Corpus Christi), the Thursday after Trinity Sunday
Dedication Festival, the first Sunday in October or the Last Sunday after Trinity, if date unknown
Christ the King, the Sunday next before Advent

January
1    The Naming and Circumcision of Jesus
2    Basil the Great and Gregory of Nazianzus, Bishops, Teachers of the Faith, 379 and 389
2    Seraphim, Monk of Sarov, Spiritual Guide, 1833
2    Vedanayagam Samuel Azariah, Bishop in South India, Evangelist, 1945
6    THE EPIPHANY – may be celebrated on the Sunday between 2 and 8 January
10    William Laud, Archbishop of Canterbury, 1645
11    Mary Slessor, Missionary in West Africa, 1915
12    Aelred of Hexham, Abbot of Rievaulx, 1167
12    Benedict Biscop, Abbot of Wearmouth, Scholar, 689
13    Hilary, Bishop of Poitiers, Teacher of the Faith, 367
13    Kentigern (Mungo), Missionary Bishop in Strathclyde and Cumbria, 603
13    George Fox, Founder of the Society of Friends (the Quakers), 1691
17    Antony of Egypt, Hermit, Abbot, 356
17    Charles Gore, Bishop, Founder of the Community of the Resurrection, 1932
18-25    WEEK OF PRAYER FOR CHRISTIAN UNITY
18    Amy Carmichael, Founder of the Dohnavur Fellowship, Spiritual Writer, 1951
19    Wulfstan, Bishop of Worcester, 1095
20    Richard Rolle of Hampole, Spiritual Writer, 1349
21    Agnes, Child Martyr at Rome, 304
22    Vincent of Saragossa, Deacon, first Martyr of Spain, 304
24    Francis de Sales, Bishop of Geneva, Teacher of the Faith, 1622
25    The Conversion of Paul
26    Timothy and Titus, Companions of Paul
28    Thomas Aquinas, Priest, Philosopher, Teacher of the Faith, 1274
30    Charles, King and Martyr, 1649
31    John Bosco, Priest, Founder of the Salesian Teaching Order, 1888

February
1    Brigid of Kildare, Abbess of Kildare, c.525
2    THE PRESENTATION OF CHRIST IN THE TEMPLE (Candlemas) – may be celebrated on the Sunday between 28 January and 3 February
3    Anskar, Archbishop of Bremen, Missionary in Denmark and Sweden, 865
4    Gilbert of Sempringham, Founder of the Gilbertine Order, 1189
6    The Martyrs of Japan, 1597
10   Scholastica, sister of Benedict, Abbess of Plombariola, c.543
14    Cyril and Methodius, Missionaries to the Slavs, 869 and 885
14    Valentine, Martyr at Rome, c.269
15    Sigfrid, Bishop, Apostle of Sweden, 1045
15    Thomas Bray, Priest, Founder of the SPCK and the SPG, 1730
17    Janani Luwum, Archbishop of Uganda, Martyr, 1977
23    Polycarp, Bishop of Smyrna, Martyr, c.155
27    George Herbert, Priest, Poet, 1633

Alternative dates:
Matthias may be celebrated on 24 February instead of 14 May.

March
1    David, Bishop of Menevia, Patron of Wales, c.601
2    Chad, Bishop of Lichfield, Missionary, 672
7    Perpetua, Felicity and their Companions, Martyrs at Carthage, 203
8    Edward King, Bishop of Lincoln, 1910
8    Felix, Bishop, Apostle to the East Angles, 647
8    Geoffrey Studdert Kennedy, Priest, Poet, 1929
17    Patrick, Bishop, Missionary, Patron of Ireland, c.460
18    Cyril, Bishop of Jerusalem, Teacher of the Faith, 386
19    Joseph of Nazareth
20    Cuthbert, Bishop of Lindisfarne, Missionary, 687
21    Thomas Cranmer, Archbishop of Canterbury, Reformation Martyr, 1556
24    Walter Hilton of Thurgarton, Augustinian Canon, Mystic, 1396
24    Paul Couturier, Priest, Ecumenist, 1953
24    Óscar Romero, Archbishop of San Salvador, Martyr, 1980
25    THE ANNUNCIATION OF OUR LORD TO THE BLESSED VIRGIN MARY
26    Harriet Monsell, Founder of the Community of St John the Baptist, 1883
31    John Donne, Priest, Poet, 1631

Alternative dates:
Chad may be celebrated with Cedd on 26 October instead of 2 March. Cuthbert may be celebrated on 4 September instead of 20 March.

April
1    Frederick Denison Maurice, Priest, Teacher of the Faith, 1872
9    Dietrich Bonhoeffer, Lutheran Pastor, Martyr, 1945
10    William Law, Priest, Spiritual Writer, 1761
10    William of Ockham, Friar, Philosopher, Teacher of the Faith, 1347
11    George Selwyn, first Bishop of New Zealand, 1878
16    Isabella Gilmore, Deaconess, 1923
19    Alphege, Archbishop of Canterbury, Martyr, 1012
21    Anselm, Abbot of Le Bec, Archbishop of Canterbury, Teacher of the Faith, 1109
23    George, Martyr, Patron of England, c.304
24    Mellitus, Bishop of London, first Bishop at St Paul's, 624
24    The Seven Martyrs of the Melanesian Brotherhood, Solomon Islands, 2003
25    Mark the Evangelist
27    Christina Rossetti, Poet, 1894
28    Peter Chanel, Missionary in the South Pacific, Martyr, 1841
29    Catherine of Siena, Teacher of the Faith, 1380
30    Pandita Mary Ramabai, Translator of the Scriptures, 1922

May
1    Philip and James, Apostles
2    Athanasius, Bishop of Alexandria, Teacher of the Faith, 373
4    English Saints and Martyrs of the Reformation Era
8    Julian of Norwich, Spiritual Writer, c.1417
12    Gregory Dix, Priest, Monk, Scholar, 1952
14    Matthias the Apostle
16    Caroline Chisholm, Social Reformer, 1877
19    Dunstan, Archbishop of Canterbury, Restorer of Monastic Life, 988
20    Alcuin of York, Deacon, Abbot of Tours, 804
21    Helena, Protector of the Holy Places, 330
24    John and Charles Wesley, Evangelists, Hymn Writers, 1791 and 1788
25    The Venerable Bede, Monk at Jarrow, Scholar, Historian, 735
25    Aldhelm, Bishop of Sherborne, 709
26    Augustine, first Archbishop of Canterbury, 605
26    John Calvin, Reformer, 1564
26    Philip Neri, Founder of the Oratorians, Spiritual Guide, 1595
28    Lanfranc, Prior of Le Bec, Archbishop of Canterbury, Scholar, 1089
30    Josephine Butler, Social Reformer, 1906
30    Joan of Arc, Visionary, 1431
30    Apolo Kivebulaya, Priest, Evangelist in Central Africa, 1933
31    The Visit of the Blessed Virgin Mary to Elizabeth

Alternative dates:
Matthias may be celebrated on 24 February instead of 14 May.
The Visit of the Blessed Virgin Mary to Elizabeth may be celebrated on 2 July instead of 31 May.

June
1    Justin, Martyr at Rome, c.165
3    The Martyrs of Uganda, 1885–7 and 1977
4    Petroc, Abbot of Padstow, 6th century
5    Boniface (Wynfrith) of Crediton, Bishop, Apostle of Germany, Martyr, 754
6    Ini Kopuria, Founder of the Melanesian Brotherhood, 1945
8    Thomas Ken, Bishop of Bath and Wells, Nonjuror, Hymn Writer, 1711
9    Columba, Abbot of Iona, Missionary, 597
9    Ephrem of Syria, Deacon, Hymn Writer, Teacher of the Faith, 373
11    Barnabas the Apostle
14    Richard Baxter, Puritan Divine, 1691
15    Evelyn Underhill, Spiritual Writer, 1941
16    Richard, Bishop of Chichester, 1253
16    Joseph Butler, Bishop of Durham, Philosopher, 1752
17    Samuel and Henrietta Barnett, Social Reformers, 1913 and 1936
18    Bernard Mizeki, Apostle of the MaShona, Martyr, 1896
19    Sundar Singh of India, Sadhu (holy man), Evangelist, Teacher of the Faith, 1929
22    Alban, first Martyr of Britain, c.250
23    Etheldreda, Abbess of Ely, c.678
24    The Birth of John the Baptist
27    Cyril, Bishop of Alexandria, Teacher of the Faith, 444
28    Irenæus, Bishop of Lyon, Teacher of the Faith, c.200
29    Peter and Paul, Apostles

Alternative dates:
Peter the Apostle may be celebrated alone, without Paul, on 29 June.

July
1    Henry, John, and Henry Venn the younger, Priests, Evangelical Divines, 1797, 1813 and 1873
3    Thomas the Apostle
6    Thomas More, Scholar, and John Fisher, Bishop of Rochester, Reformation Martyrs, 1535
11    Benedict of Nursia, Abbot of Monte Cassino, Father of Western Monasticism, c.550
14    John Keble, Priest, Tractarian, Poet, 1866
15    Swithun, Bishop of Winchester, c.862
15    Bonaventure, Friar, Bishop, Teacher of the Faith, 1274
16    Osmund, Bishop of Salisbury, 1099
18    Elizabeth Ferard, first Deaconess of the Church of England, Founder of the Community of St Andrew, 1883
19    Gregory, Bishop of Nyssa, and his sister Macrina, Deaconess, Teachers of the Faith, c.394 and c.379
20    Margaret of Antioch, Martyr, 4th century
20    Bartolomé de las Casas, Apostle to the Indies, 1566
22    Mary Magdalene
23    Bridget of Sweden, Abbess of Vadstena, 1373
25    James the Apostle
26    Anne and Joachim, Parents of the Blessed Virgin Mary
27    Brooke Foss Westcott, Bishop of Durham, Teacher of the Faith, 1901
29    Mary, Martha and Lazarus, Companions of Our Lord
30    William Wilberforce, Social Reformer, Olaudah Equiano and Thomas Clarkson, Anti-Slavery Campaigners, 1833, 1797 and 1846
31    Ignatius of Loyola, Founder of the Society of Jesus, 1556

Alternative dates:
The Visit of the Blessed Virgin Mary to Elizabeth may be celebrated on 2 July instead of 31 May.
Thomas the Apostle may be celebrated on 21 December instead of 3 July.
Thomas Becket may be celebrated on 7 July instead of 29 December.

August
4    Jean-Baptiste Vianney, Curé d'Ars, Spiritual Guide, 1859
5    Oswald, King of Northumbria, Martyr, 642
6    The Transfiguration of Our Lord
7    John Mason Neale, Priest, Hymn Writer, 1866
8    Dominic, Priest, Founder of the Order of Preachers, 1221
9    Mary Sumner, Founder of the Mothers' Union, 1921
10    Laurence, Deacon at Rome, Martyr, 258
11    Clare of Assisi, Founder of the Minoresses (Poor Clares), 1253
11    John Henry Newman, Priest, Tractarian, 1890
13    Jeremy Taylor, Bishop of Down and Connor, Teacher of the Faith, 1667
13    Florence Nightingale, Nurse, Social Reformer, 1910
13    Octavia Hill, Social Reformer, 1912
14    Maximilian Kolbe, Friar, Martyr, 1941
15    The Blessed Virgin Mary
20    Bernard, Abbot of Clairvaux, Teacher of the Faith, 1153
20    William and Catherine Booth, Founders of the Salvation Army, 1912 and 1890
24    Bartholomew the Apostle
27    Monica, mother of Augustine of Hippo, 387
28    Augustine, Bishop of Hippo, Teacher of the Faith, 430
29    The Beheading of John the Baptist
30    John Bunyan, Spiritual Writer, 1688
31    Aidan, Bishop of Lindisfarne, Missionary, 651

Alternative dates:
The Blessed Virgin Mary may be celebrated on 8 September or 8 December instead of 15 August.

September
1    Giles of Provence, Hermit, c.710
2    The Martyrs of Papua New Guinea, 1901 and 1942
3    Gregory the Great, Bishop of Rome, Teacher of the Faith, 604
4    Birinus, Bishop of Dorchester (Oxon), Apostle of Wessex, 650
6    Allen Gardiner, Missionary, Founder of the South American Mission Society, 1851
8    The Birth of the Blessed Virgin Mary
9    Charles Fuge Lowder, Priest, 1880
13    John Chrysostom, Bishop of Constantinople, Teacher of the Faith, 407
14    Holy Cross Day
15    Cyprian, Bishop of Carthage, Martyr, 258
16    Ninian, Bishop of Galloway, Apostle of the Picts, c.432
16    Edward Bouverie Pusey, Priest, Tractarian, 1882
17    Hildegard, Abbess of Bingen, Visionary, 1179
19    Theodore of Tarsus, Archbishop of Canterbury, 690
20    John Coleridge Patteson, First Bishop of Melanesia, and his Companions, Martyrs, 1871
21    Matthew, Apostle and Evangelist
25    Lancelot Andrewes, Bishop of Winchester, Spiritual Writer, 1626
25    Sergei of Radonezh, Russian Monastic Reformer, Teacher of the Faith, 1392
26    Wilson Carlile, Founder of the Church Army, 1942
27    Vincent de Paul, Founder of the Congregation of the Mission (Lazarists), 1660
29    Michael and All Angels
30    Jerome, Translator of the Scriptures, Teacher of the Faith, 420

Alternative dates:
Cuthbert may be celebrated on 4 September instead of 20 March.

October
1    Remigius, Bishop of Rheims, Apostle of the Franks, 533
1    Anthony Ashley Cooper, Earl of Shaftesbury, Social Reformer, 1885
3    George Bell, Bishop of Chichester, Ecumenist, Peacemaker, 1958
4    Francis of Assisi, Friar, Deacon, Founder of the Friars Minor, 1226
6    William Tyndale, Translator of the Scriptures, Reformation Martyr, 1536
9    Denys, Bishop of Paris, and his Companions, Martyrs, c.250
9    Robert Grosseteste, Bishop of Lincoln, Philosopher, Scientist, 1253
10    Paulinus, Bishop of York, Missionary, 644
10    Thomas Traherne, Poet, Spiritual Writer, 1674
11    Ethelburga, Abbess of Barking, 675
11    James the Deacon, companion of Paulinus, 7th century
12    Wilfrid of Ripon, Bishop, Missionary, 709
12    Elizabeth Fry, Prison Reformer, 1845
12    Edith Cavell, Nurse, 1915
13    Edward the Confessor, King of England, 1066
15    Teresa of Avila, Teacher of the Faith, 1582
16    Nicholas Ridley, Bishop of London, and Hugh Latimer, Bishop of Worcester, Reformation Martyrs, 1555
17    Ignatius, Bishop of Antioch, Martyr, c.107
18    Luke the Evangelist
19    Henry Martyn, Translator of the Scriptures, Missionary in India and Persia, 1812
25    Crispin and Crispinian, Martyrs at Rome, c.287
26    Alfred the Great, King of the West Saxons, Scholar, 899
26    Cedd, Abbot of Lastingham, Bishop of the East Saxons, 664
28    Simon and Jude, Apostles
29    James Hannington, Bishop of Eastern Equatorial Africa, Martyr in Uganda, 1885
31    Martin Luther, Reformer, 1546

Alternative dates:
Chad may be celebrated with Cedd on 26 October instead of 2 March.

November
1    ALL SAINTS' DAY
2    Commemoration of the Faithful Departed (All Souls' Day)
3    Richard Hooker, Priest, Anglican Apologist, Teacher of the Faith, 1600
3    Martin of Porres, Friar, 1639
6    Leonard, Hermit, 6th century
6    William Temple, Archbishop of Canterbury, Teacher of the Faith, 1944
7    Willibrord of York, Bishop, Apostle of Frisia, 739
8    The Saints and Martyrs of England
9    Margery Kempe, Mystic, c.1440
10    Leo the Great, Bishop of Rome, Teacher of the Faith, 461
11    Martin, Bishop of Tours, c.397
13    Charles Simeon, Priest, Evangelical Divine, 1836
14    Samuel Seabury, first Anglican Bishop in North America, 1796
16    Margaret, Queen of Scotland, Philanthropist, Reformer of the Church, 1093
16    Edmund Rich of Abingdon, Archbishop of Canterbury, 1240
17    Hugh, Bishop of Lincoln, 1200
18    Elizabeth of Hungary, Princess of Thuringia, Philanthropist, 1231
19    Hilda, Abbess of Whitby, 680
19    Mechthild, Béguine of Magdeburg, Mystic, 1280
20    Edmund, King of the East Angles, Martyr, 870
20    Priscilla Lydia Sellon, a Restorer of the Religious Life in the Church of England, 1876
22    Cecilia, Martyr at Rome, c.230
23    Clement, Bishop of Rome, Martyr, c.100
25    Catherine of Alexandria, Martyr, 4th century
25    Isaac Watts, Hymn Writer, 1748
29    DAY OF INTERCESSION AND THANKSGIVING FOR THE MISSIONARY WORK OF THE CHURCH
30    Andrew the Apostle

December
1    Charles de Foucauld, Hermit in the Sahara, 1916
3    Francis Xavier, Jesuit Missionary, Apostle of the Indies, 1552
4    John of Damascus, Monk, Teacher of the Faith, c.749
4    Nicholas Ferrar, Deacon, Founder of the Little Gidding community, 1637
6    Nicholas, Bishop of Myra, c.326
7    Ambrose, Bishop of Milan, Teacher of the Faith, 397
8    The Conception of the Blessed Virgin Mary
13    Lucy, Martyr at Syracuse, 304
13    Samuel Johnson, Moralist, 1784
14    John of the Cross, Poet, Teacher of the Faith, 1591
17    O SAPIENTIA
17    Eglantine Jebb, Social Reformer, Founder of 'Save The Children', 1928
24    Christmas Eve
25    CHRISTMAS DAY
26    Stephen, Deacon, First Martyr
27    John, Apostle and Evangelist
28    The Holy Innocents
29    Thomas Becket, Archbishop of Canterbury, Martyr, 1170
31    John Wyclif, Reformer, 1384

Alternative dates:
Thomas the Apostle may be celebrated on 21 December instead of 3 July.
Thomas Becket may be celebrated on 7 July instead of 29 December.

See also

 Calendar of saints (Episcopal Church in the United States of America)
 Coptic Orthodox calendar of saints
 List of saints
 Movable feasts
 Name days
 General Roman Calendar
 Calendar of saints

References

External links

England
Church of England festivals